Viktoriya Leontyivna Motrichko (born  in Odessa, Ukrainian SSR) is a Ukrainian draughts player, an International Grandmaster since 2005. She was the World champion in Brazilian draughts in 2007 and the winner of the World Mind Sports Games in Russian checkers in 2008.

Junior career 
Viktoriya Motrichko started playing draughts at the age of 10 and currently specializes in draughts-64 (Russian and Brazilian versions). In these two variants she won numerous World and European junior championships starting 2002 when she became World and European champion among mini-cadets. In the following years she won 9 more European and 6 more World titles.

Senior career

2005-2008 
In 2005 Motrichko won senior Ukrainian championship in Russian checkers. The same year she took a silver medal at the senior World championships in Dnipropetrovsk with the same result as the champion, Elena Miskova from Moldova. In 2006 she won the Ukrainian championship in International draughts.

Viktoriya's best results came in 2007 and 2008. First, being only 18 years old, she won the first World Women Championships in Brazilian draughts in Nidzica (Poland), and the next year she took the gold medal in Russian checkers at the World Mind Sports Games in Beijing while defeating Miskova in the final barrage. In 2008 she also became World junior vice-champion in International draughts.

2009-2010 
In 2009 Motrichko added a third senior World championships medal to her collection, winning a bronze at the World Russian checkers championship in Rubizhne (Ukraine), and in 2010 she became a silver medalist at the European senior championships in Varna. In 2010 she also won her second Ukrainian title in Russian checkers.

References

External links 
 
 Profile in the Tournament database of the Dutch Draughts Federation

Ukrainian draughts players
Players of Brazilian draughts
Players of Russian draughts
1989 births
Living people